Lucifer Songs is the third album by the Italian experimental metal band Ufomammut, released in 2005.

Track list

References

2005 albums
Ufomammut albums